In enzymology, a (RS)-1-benzyl-1,2,3,4-tetrahydroisoquinoline N-methyltransferase is an enzyme that catalyzes the chemical reaction:

 S-adenosyl-L-methionine + (RS)-1-benzyl-1,2,3,4-tetrahydroisoquinoline  S-adenosyl-L-homocysteine + N-methyl-(RS)-1-benzyl-1,2,3,4-tetrahydroisoquinoline
This enzyme participates in alkaloid biosynthesis.

Nomenclature 

This enzyme belongs to the family of transferases, specifically those transferring one-carbon group methyltransferases.  The systematic name of this enzyme class is S-adenosyl-L-methionine:(RS)-1-benzyl-1,2,3,4-tetrahydroisoquinoline N-methyltransferase. This enzyme is also called norreticuline N-methyltransferase.

References

EC 2.1.1
Enzymes of unknown structure